Physiognomy (from the Greek , , meaning "nature", and , meaning "judge" or "interpreter") is the practice of assessing a person's character or personality from their outer appearance—especially the face. The term can also refer to the general appearance of a person, object, or terrain without reference to its implied characteristics—as in the physiognomy of an individual plant (see plant life-form) or of a plant community (see vegetation).

Physiognomy as a practice has been met with criticism, and practice has been labeled by some as pseudoscience and it is so regarded among academic circles because of its unsupported claims; popular belief in the practice of physiognomy is nonetheless still widespread and modern advances in artificial intelligence have sparked renewed interest in the field of study. The practice was well-accepted by  ancient Greek philosophers, but fell into disrepute in the Middle Ages while practised by vagabonds and mountebanks. It revived and was popularised by Johann Kaspar Lavater, before falling from favor in the late 19th century. Physiognomy in the 19th century is particularly noted as a basis for scientific racism. Physiognomy as it is understood today is a subject of renewed scientific interest,  especially as it relates to machine learning and facial recognition technologyThe main interest for scientists today are the risks, including privacy concerns, of physiognomy in the context of facial recognition algorithms. 

Physiognomy is sometimes referred to as 'anthroposcopy', a term originating in the 19th century.

Ancient

Notions of the relationship between an individual's outward appearance and inner character date back to antiquity, and occasionally appear in early Greek poetry. Siddhars from ancient India defined  as identifying personal characteristics with body features. Chinese physiognomy or Chinese face reading dates back to at least the Spring and Autumn period.

Early indications of a developed physiognomic theory appear in 5th century BC Athens, with the works of Zopyrus (who was featured in a dialogue by Phaedo of Elis), an expert in the art. By the 4th century BC, the philosopher Aristotle frequently referred to theory and literature concerning the relationship of appearance to character. Aristotle was receptive to such an idea, evidenced by a passage in his Prior Analytics:

The first systematic physiognomic treatise is a slim volume,  (Physiognomonics), ascribed to Aristotle, but probably of his "school", rather than created by Aristotle himself. The volume is divided into two parts, conjectured as originally two separate works. The first section discusses arguments drawn from nature and describes other races (non-Greek) and concentrates on the concept of human behavior. The second section focuses on animal behavior, dividing the animal kingdom into male and female types. From these are deduced correspondences between human form and character.

After Aristotle, the major extant works in physiognomy are:

Polemo of Laodicea,  (2nd century AD), in Greek
Adamantius the Sophist,  (4th century), in Greek
An anonymous Latin author,  (about 4th century)

Ancient Greek mathematician, astronomer, and scientist Pythagoras—who some believe originated physiognomics—once rejected a prospective follower named Cylon because, to Pythagoras, his appearance indicated bad character.

After inspecting Socrates, a physiognomist announced he was given to intemperance, sensuality, and violent bursts of passion—which was so contrary to Socrates's image, his students accused the physiognomist of lying. Socrates put the issue to rest by saying, originally, he was given to all these vices, but had particularly strong self-discipline.

Middle Ages and Renaissance

Physiognomy's validity was once widely accepted. Michael Scot, a court scholar for Frederick II, Holy Roman Emperor, wrote  in the early 13th century concerning the subject. English universities taught physiognomy until Henry VIII of England outlawed "beggars and vagabonds playing 'subtile, crafty and unlawful games such as physnomye or 'palmestrye'" in 1530 or 1531. Around this time, scholastic leaders settled on the more erudite Greek form 'physiognomy' and began to discourage the entire concept of 'fisnamy'.

Leonardo da Vinci dismissed physiognomy in the early 16th century as "false", a chimera with "no scientific foundation". Nevertheless, da Vinci believed that facial lines caused by facial expressions could indicate personality traits. For example, he wrote that "those who have deep and noticeable lines between the eyebrows are irascible".

Modern

Johann Kaspar Lavater

The principal promoter of physiognomy in modern times was the Swiss pastor Johann Kaspar Lavater (1741–1801) who was briefly a friend of Goethe. Lavater's essays on physiognomy were first published in German in 1772 and gained great popularity. These influential essays were translated into French and English, and influenced early criminological theory.

Lavater's critics

Lavater received mixed reactions from scientists, with some accepting his research and others criticizing it. His harshest critic was scientist Georg Christoph Lichtenberg, who said pathognomy, or discovering the character of a person by observing their behavior, was more effective. English religious writer Hannah More (1745-1833) complained to her contemporary writer Horace Walpole, "In vain do we boast ... that philosophy had broken down all the strongholds of prejudice, ignorance, and superstition; and yet, at this very time ... Lavater's physiognomy books sell at fifteen guineas a set."

Thomas Browne

Lavater found confirmation of his ideas from the English physician-philosopher Sir Thomas Browne (1605–1682), and the Italian Giambattista Della Porta (1535–1615). Browne in his Religio Medici (1643) discusses the possibility of the discernment of inner qualities from the outer appearance of the face, and wrote:

Browne reaffirmed his physiognomic beliefs in Christian Morals (circa 1675):

Browne also introduced the word caricature into the English language, whence much of physiognomical belief attempted to entrench itself by illustrative means, in particular through visual political satire.

Italian scholar Giambattista della Porta's works are well represented in the Library of Sir Thomas Browne including Of Celestial Physiognomy, in which della Porta argued that it was not the stars but a person's temperament that influences their facial appearance and character. In De humana physiognomia (1586), della Porta used woodcuts of animals to illustrate human characteristics. Both della Porta and Browne adhered to the 'doctrine of signatures'—that is, the belief that the physical structures of nature such as a plant's roots, stem, and flower, were indicative keys (or 'signatures') to their medicinal potentials.

Period of popularity

The popularity of physiognomy grew throughout the first quarter of the 18th century and into the 19th century. It was discussed seriously by academics, who believed in its potential.

Use in fiction and art
Many European novelists used physiognomy in the descriptions of their characters, notably Balzac, Chaucer and portrait artists, such as Joseph Ducreux. A host of 19th-century English authors were influenced by the idea, notably evident in the detailed physiognomic descriptions of characters in the novels of Charles Dickens, Thomas Hardy, and Charlotte Brontë.

In addition to Thomas Browne, other literary authors associated with Norwich who made physiognomical observations in their writings include the romantic novelist Amelia Opie, and the travelogue author George Borrow.

Physiognomy is a central, implicit assumption underlying the plot of Oscar Wilde's The Picture of Dorian Gray. In 19th-century American literature, physiognomy figures prominently in the short stories of Edgar Allan Poe.

Phrenology
Phrenology, a form of physiognomy, measures the bumps on the skull in order to determine mental and personality characteristics, was created around 1800 by German physician Franz Joseph Gall and Johann Spurzheim, and was widely popular in the 19th century in Europe and the United States. In the U.S., physician James W. Redfield published his Comparative Physiognomy in 1852, illustrating with 330 engravings the "Resemblances between Men and Animals". He finds these in appearance and (often metaphorically) character, e.g. Germans to Lions, Negroes to Elephants and Fishes, Chinamen to Hogs, Yankees to Bears, Jews to Goats.

In the late 19th century, phrenology became associated with physiognomy and consequently was discredited and rejected. Nevertheless, the German physiognomist Carl Huter (1861–1912) became popular in Germany with his concept of physiognomy, called "psycho-physiognomy".

Criminology

During the late 19th century, English psychometrician Sir Francis Galton attempted to define physiognomic characteristics of health, disease, beauty, and criminality, via a method of composite photography. Galton's process involved the photographic superimposition of two or more faces by multiple exposures. After averaging together photographs of violent criminals, he found that the composite image appeared "more respectable" than any of the faces comprising it; this was likely due to the irregularities of the skin across the constituent images being averaged out in the final blend. With the advent of computer technology during the early 1990s, Galton's composite technique has been adopted and greatly improved using computer graphics software.

Physiognomy also became of use in the field of Criminology through efforts made by Italian army doctor and scientist, Cesare Lombroso. Lombroso, during the mid-19th century, championed the notion that "criminality was inherited and that criminals could be identified by physical attributes such as hawk-like noses and bloodshot eyes". Lombroso took inspiration from Charles Darwin's recently released theories of evolution and carried many of the misunderstandings that he had regarding evolution into the propagation of the use of physiognomy in criminology. His logic stemmed from the idea that "criminals were 'throwbacks' in the phylogenetic tree to early phases of evolution". It is reasonable to conclude that "according to Lombroso, a regressive characteristic united the genius, the madman and the delinquent; they differed in the intensity of this characteristic and, naturally in the degree of development of the positive qualities". He believed that one could determine whether one was of savage nature just by their physical characteristics. Based on his findings, "Lombroso proposed that the "born criminal" could be distinguished by physical atavistic stigmata, such as:
 Large jaws, forward projection of jaw
 Low sloping forehead
 High cheekbones
 Flattened or upturned nose
 Handle-shaped ears
 Hawk-like noses or fleshy lips
 Hard shifty eyes
 Scanty beard or baldness
 Insensitivity to pain
 Long arms relative to lower limbs

This interest in the relationship between criminology and physiognomy began upon Lombroso's first interaction with "a notorious Calabrian thief and arsonist" named Giuseppe Villella. Lombroso was particularly taken by many striking personality characteristics that Villella possessed; agility and cynicism being some of them. Villella’s alleged crimes are disputed and Lombroso’s research is seen by many as northern Italian racism toward southern Italians. Upon Villella's death, Lombroso "conducted a post-mortem and discovered that his subject had an indentation at the back of his skull, which resembled that found in apes". He later referred to this anomaly as the "median occipital depression". Lombroso used the term "atavism" to describe these primitive, ape-like behaviors that he found in many of those whom he deemed  prone to criminality. As he continued analyzing the data he gathered from Villella's autopsy and compared and contrasted those results with previous cases, he inferred that certain physical characteristics allowed for some individuals to have a greater "propensity to offend and were also savage throwbacks to early man". 

These sorts of examinations yielded far-reaching consequences for various scientific and medical communities at the time, and he wrote, "the natural genesis of crime implied that the criminal personality should be regarded as a particular form of psychiatric disease"., which is an idea still seen today in psychiatry’s diagnostic manual, the DSM-5, in its description of antisocial personality disorder. Furthermore, these ideas promoted the concept that when a crime is committed, it is no longer seen as "free will" but instead a result of one's genetic pre-disposition to savagery. Lombroso had numerous case studies to corroborate many of his findings due to the fact that  he was the head of an insane asylum at Pesaro. He was easily able to study people from various walks of life and was thus able to further define criminal types. Because his theories primarily focused on anatomy and anthropological information, the idea of degeneracy being a source of atavism was not explored till later on in his criminological theory endeavors. These "new and improved" theories led to the notion "that the born criminal had pathological symptoms in common with the moral imbecile and the epileptic, and this led him to expand his typology to include the insane criminal and the epileptic criminal". In addition, "the insane criminal type [was said to] include the alcoholic, the mattoid, and the hysterical criminal". 

Lombroso's ideologies are now recognized as flawed and regarded as pseudo-science. Many have remarked on the overt sexist and racist overtones of his research, and denounce it for those reasons alone. In spite of many of his theories being discredited, he is still hailed as the father of "scientific criminology".

Contemporary usage

In France, the concept was further developed in the 20th century under the name morphopsychology, developed by Louis Corman (1901–1995), a French psychiatrist who argued that the workings of vital forces within the human body resulted in different facial shapes and forms. The term "morphopsychology" is a translation of the French word morphopsychologie, which Louis Corman coined in 1937 when he wrote his first book on the subject, Quinze leçons de morphopsychologie (Fifteen Lessons of Morphopsychology).

Scientific investigation 
Due to its legacy of racism and junk science masquerading as criminology, the scientific study or even discussing the relationship between facial features and character have become taboo. However, science has uncovered many links between character and facial appearance. For example, there is evidence that character can influence facial appearance. Also, facial characteristics influences first impressions of others, which influences our expectations and behavior, which in turn influences character. Lastly, there are several biological factors that influence both facial appearance and character traits, such pre- and post-natal hormone levels and gene expression. 

Recent progress in AI and computer vision has been largely driven by the widespread adoption of deep neural networks (DNN), which mimic the neocortex by simulating large, multi-level networks of interconnected neurons. DNNs excel at recognizing patterns in large unstructured data such as digital images, sound, or text, and analyzing such patterns to make predictions. The superior performance of DNNs offers an opportunity to identify links between characteristics and facial features that might be missed or misinterpreted by the human brain.

The relationship between facial features and character traits such as political or sexual orientation is complex, but involves the fact that facial features can shape social behavior, partially as a result of the self-fulfilling prophecy effect. The self-fulfilling prophesy effect asserts that people perceived to have a certain attribute will be treated accordingly, and over time may engage in behaviors consistent with others’ expectations of them. Conversely, social behavior such as addictions to drugs or alcohol, can shape facial features.

Research in the 1990s indicated that three elements of personality in particular – power, warmth and honesty – can be reliably inferred by looking at facial features.

Some evidence indicated that the pattern of whorls in the scalp had some correlation to male homosexuality, though subsequent research has largely refuted the findings on hair whorl patterns.

A February 2009 article in New Scientist magazine reported that physiognomy is living a small revival, with research papers trying to find links between personality traits and facial traits. A study of 90 ice hockey players found a statistically significant correlation between a wider face—a greater than average cheekbone-to-cheekbone distance relative to the distance between brow and upper lip—and the number of penalty minutes a player received for violent acts like slashing, elbowing, checking from behind, and fighting.

This revival has continued in the 2010s with the rise of machine learning for facial recognition. For instance, researchers have claimed that it is possible to predict upper body strength and some personality traits (propensity to aggression) only by looking at the width of the face. Political orientation can also be reliably predicted.In a study that used facial recognition technology by analyzing the faces of over one million individuals, political orientation was predicted correctly 74% of the time; considerably better than chance (50%), human ability (55%) or even personality questionnaires (68%). Other studies have used AI and machine learning techniques to identify facial characteristics that predict honesty, personality, and intelligence.

In 2017, a controversial study claimed that an AI algorithm could detect sexual orientation 'more accurately than humans' (in 81% of the tested cases for men and 71% for women). A director of research of the Human Rights Campaign (HRC) accused the study of being "junk science" to the BBC. The director, an 'equity and inclusion strategist' with no scientific background, was criticized by the researchers for "premature judgement". In early 2018, researchers, among them two specialists of AI working at Google (one of the two on face recognition), issued a reportedly contradicting study based on a survey of 8,000 Americans using Amazon's Mechanical Turk crowd-sourcing platform. The survey yielded many traits that were used to discriminate between gay and straight respondents with a series of yes/no questions. These traits had actually less to do with morphology than with grooming, presentation, and lifestyle (makeup, facial hair, glasses, angle of pictures taken of self, etc.). For more information of this sexual orientation issue in general, see gaydar.

In 2020, a study on the use of consumer facial images for marketing research purposes concluded that deep learning on facial images can extract a variety of personal information relevant to marketers and so users' facial images could become a basis for ad targeting on Tinder and Facebook. According to the study, while most of facial images' predictive power is attributable to basic demographics (age, gender, race) extracted from the face, image artifacts, observable facial characteristics, and other image features extracted by deep learning all contribute to prediction quality beyond demographics.

Theoretical pathways linking facial appearance with psychological traits 

Kosinski (2023) argues that there are three theoretical pathways that could link facial appearance with psychological traits. The three pathways are:

First, facial appearance can shape psychological traits (face→mind pathway). The self-fulfilling prophecy effect postulates that people perceived as having a particular attribute are treated accordingly; internalize such attributions; and, over time, may engage in behaviors consistent with others’ perceptions. For example, people with larger jaws are perceived as more socially dominant; and thus, with time, may become more so 2011). Moreover, face-based perceptions influence consequential outcomes such as the length of prison sentences, occupational success, educational attainments, the chances of winning an election, income, and status. 
 
Second, there are latent factors shaping both psychological traits and facial appearance (face←factor→mind pathway). Those include socioeconomic status, environmental and developmental conditions, hormones, genes, etc. Twin studies, for example, have found that genes are responsible for over 50% of the variation in both facial features and political orientation. Similarly, prenatal and postnatal testosterone affect jaw shape and are linked—to a small degree—with character traits closely related to political orientation, such as conscientiousness. Furthermore, prenatal exposure to nicotine and alcohol affects facial morphology and cognitive ability, which is associated with political orientation 

Third, psychological traits can shape facial appearance (mind→face pathway). While we tend to think of facial features as relatively fixed, they are shaped by factors such as facial care, diet, substance use, physical health, injuries, exposure to sunlight, harsh environmental conditions, or emotional states. Exposure to such face-altering factors, in turn, is associated with psychological traits. Liberals, for example, tend to smile more intensely and genuinely—which, over time, leaves traces in wrinkle patternsConservatives tend to be more self-disciplined and are thus healthier, consume less alcohol and tobacco, and have a better diet, altering their facial fat distribution and skin health

In media 
In 2011, the South Korean news agency Yonhap published a physiognomical analysis of the current leader of North Korea, Kim Jong-un.

Related disciplines

 Anthropological criminology
 Anthropometry
 Characterology
 Metoposcopy
 Onychomancy
 Palmistry
 Pathognomy
 Phrenology
 Somatotype and constitutional psychology

References

Further reading
 Claudia Schmölders, Hitler's Face: The Biography of an Image. Translated by Adrian Daub. University of Pennsylvania Press: 2006. .
 Liz Gerstein, About Face. SterlingHouse Publisher, Inc. 
 
Rüdiger Campe and Manfred Schndier, Geschichten der Physiognomik. Text-Bild-Wissen, (Freiburg: Rombach, 1996).

External links

Johann Kaspar Lavater On The Nature of Man, Which is the Foundation of the Science Which is called Physiognomy 1775

Selected images from: Della Porta, Giambattista: De humana physiognomonia libri IIII (Vico Equense, 1586). Historical Anatomies on the Web. National Library of Medicine.
Women's traits 'written on face' (BBC News Wednesday, 11 February 2009)
"On Physiognomy" – An Essay by Arthur Schopenhauer
"Composite Portraits", by Francis Galton, 1878 (as published in the Journal of the Anthropological Institute of Great Britain and Ireland, volume 8).
"Enquiries into Human Faculty and its Development", book by Francis Galton, 1883.
French Society for Morphopsychology

 
Pseudoscience

de:Physiognomik